The Ministry for Europe and Foreign Affairs is the ministry of the Government of France that handles France's foreign relations. Since 1855, its headquarters have been located at 37 Quai d'Orsay, close to the National Assembly. The term Quai d'Orsay is often used as a metonym for the ministry. Its cabinet minister, the Minister of Europe and Foreign Affairs is responsible for the foreign relations of France. The current officeholder, Catherine Colonna, was appointed in 2022.

In 1547, royal secretaries became specialised, writing correspondence to foreign governments and negotiating peace treaties. The four French secretaries of state where foreign relations were divided by region, in 1589, became centralised with one becoming first secretary responsible for international relations. The Ancien Régime position of Secretary of State for Foreign Affairs became Foreign Minister around 1723; it was renamed Minister of Foreign Affairs in 1791 in the aftermath of early stages of the French Revolution. All ministerial positions were abolished in 1794 by the National Convention and reestablished with the Directory.

For a brief period in the 1980s, the office was retitled Minister for External Relations.

Central administration 

There are multiple services under its authority, along with that of some other ministers. Under the authority of the Minister of Foreign Affairs and International Development, that of Cooperation and European Affairs, and that of Foreign and European Affairs, there are numerous services directly related to the ministers. Here is a list of those services.
 The ministers' cabinet
 The office of cabinets, which gathers a personnel in charge of the administrative and logistics aspects of the three ministers' cabinets
 The budget control service (CBCM)
 General inspection of foreign affairs (IGAE)
 The prospective office (DP)
 The Protocole, upon which the President's protocol cell relies
 The Crisis management Department (CDC)

Secretaries of State (1547–1723)

Secretaries of State for Foreign Affairs (1718–1791)

Ministers of Foreign Affairs (1791–2007)

Consulate and First Empire

First Restoration and the Hundred Days

Second Restoration

July Monarchy

Second Republic

Second Empire

Third Republic

Vichy Regime

Free French Commissioners

Fourth Republic

Fifth Republic

Ministers of Foreign and European Affairs (2007–2012)

Ministers of Foreign Affairs and International Development (2012–2017)

Ministers of Europe and Foreign Affairs (2017–present)

See also
 List of Ministers of Foreign Affairs (France)
 History of French foreign relations to 1980
 Foreign relations of France Since 1980

References

Further reading
 Feske, Victor H. "The Road To Suez: The British Foreign Office and the Quai D’Orsay, 1951–1957" in The Diplomats, 1939–1979 (2019) pp. 167–200; online

External links 

140 Ministries of Foreign Affairs (1589–2000) on the French Ministry of Foreign Affairs website.
Official site of the Ministry of Foreign Affairs
Official treaty database of France
Dictionnaire historique des institutions, mœurs et coutumes de la France, Adolphe Chéruel, L. Hachette et cie, 1855
"Ministries 1700–1870", Rulers.org

Minister of Foreign Affairs
Foreign Affairs
 
France